USS Dixon (AS-37) was an  submarine tender, in service to the United States Navy from 1971 through 1995. Dixon was named for George E. Dixon, commander of the Confederate submarine H. L. Hunley.

Dixon was laid down by General Dynamics Corp, Fore River Shipyard at Quincy, Massachusetts, on 7 September 1967. She was launched on 20 June 1970 and commissioned on 7 August 1971 at Norfolk Naval Shipyard, sponsored by Mrs. Paul Masterson, the wife of retired Vice Adm. Paul Masterson, USN, and commanded by Capt. D.S. Boyd, USN.

In November 1978, two female officers, Ensigns Roberta McIntyre and Macushla McCormick, boarded Dixon. They were part of the first group of female officers to serve aboard U.S. Navy ships starting in November 1978. Ensign McIntyre later became the first woman to qualify as a Surface Warfare Officer.
Dixon was decommissioned 15 December 1995 and struck 18 March 1996.

References

External links

Decommissioning ceremony photos - USS DIXON (AS 37)

NavSource.org - USS Dixon
Tenders - USS Dixon AS 37 
Press release about the boarding of the first female officers- United Press International

 

L. Y. Spear-class submarine tenders
Submarine tenders
Submarine tenders of the United States Navy
United States Navy
Ships built in Quincy, Massachusetts
1970 ships
Ships sunk as targets
Shipwrecks of the Carolina coast
Confederate States of America monuments and memorials